Raja Nanna Raja is a 1976 Kannada-language romantic thriller film, written by Salim–Javed, and the screenplay was created by Chi. Udaya Shankar. The film was directed by A. V. Sheshagiri Rao, and produced by A. L. Abbaiah Naidu. The film starred Rajkumar, Aarathi and Chandrashekhar. The songs composed by G. K. Venkatesh were received extremely well and considered as evergreen hits.

The film deals with reincarnation as the main subject, with the lead actors romancing in both the incarnations. The film was a huge success at the box-office after its release. In an episode in Weekend with Ramesh , S. P. Balasubrahmanyam had revealed that Ilaiyaraaja was working under G. K. Venkatesh as a guitar player for this movie. This movie popularized the role of the suave antihero in Kannada films.

The film was released on 27 May 1976. It had a theatrical run of 25 weeks. Similarities were noted between the core plot element of this movie and Magadheera.

Cast
 Rajkumar as Raja
 Aarathi as Ganga / Geetha
 K. S. Ashwath
 Chandrashekar
 Balakrishna
 Sampath
 Thoogudeepa Srinivas
 M. P. Shankar

Soundtrack

G. K. Venkatesh composed the soundtrack and the lyrics were written by Chi. Udaya Shankar. The album consists of five soundtracks. The song Thanuvu Manavu had another video version which was deleted from the movie. However, the version was used in Kashinath's 1989 movie Preyasi Preethisu (at the 12th minute).

References

External links
 

1976 films
1970s Kannada-language films
1970s romantic fantasy films
Films about reincarnation
Films scored by G. K. Venkatesh
Films with screenplays by Salim–Javed
Indian romantic fantasy films
Films directed by A. V. Seshagiri Rao